Associazione Sportiva Dilettante Quarto is an Italian association football club located in Quarto, Campania. The club was founded in 1986 and their official colours are white and blue.

Promotion to Serie D
Recently Quarto achieved promotion by winning the play-offs of the Eccellenza 2006-07, meaning for next season the club will be competing at Serie D level for the first time in their history. Diego Sinagra also known as Diego Maradona Jr. was part of the squad which achieved promotion.

Honours
Eccellenza Campania
Promoted: 2006–07
Promozione Campania
Champions: 2004–05

References

Football clubs in Campania
1986 establishments in Italy